Chen Lin (陳琳 ; ; died 217), courtesy name Kongzhang (孔璋), was an official, scholar and poet who lived during the late Eastern Han dynasty of China. He was one of the "Seven Scholars of Jian'an". He later served as Military Advisor to Cao Cao.

Life
Chen Lin was from Sheyang County, Guangling Commandery, which is located east of present-day Baoying County, Jiangsu.

He Jin 
He started his career during the reign of Emperor Ling (168–189) as a Registrar under He Jin, the General-in-Chief.

In 189, He Jin wanted to summon military forces from outside the imperial capital Luoyang to pressure Empress Dowager He into agreeing to exterminate the eunuch faction. Chen Lin strongly objected to this idea and argued that "to act in this manner is no difference from lighting a furnace to burn a strand of hair". He Jin did not listen to him and ended up being assassinated by the eunuch faction, while the warlord Dong Zhuo took advantage of the power vacuum to enter Luoyang and seize control of the central government.

Yuan Shao 
Chen Lin escaped from Luoyang and travelled to Ji Province, where he became a secretary of the warlord Yuan Shao, who became the Governor of Ji Province in 191. Chen helped Yuan write official documents. Around 199 or 200, Yuan asked Chen Lin to write a "declaration of war" against his rival, Cao Cao, who then controlled the Han central government and the figurehead Emperor Xian (89–220). The piece of writing, called "Proclamation to Yu Province on Behalf of Yuan Shao" (為袁紹檄豫州), contained a list of Cao Cao's "crimes", insults directed at Cao Cao's ancestors, and calls for the people in Yu Province to rise up against Cao Cao (among other things). In 200, Cao Cao defeated Yuan Shao at the decisive Battle of Guandu.

Cao Cao 
After Yuan Shao's death in 202, internal conflict broke out between his sons Yuan Tan and Yuan Shang over control of their father's territories in northern China. Cui Yan, whom both Yuan Tan and Yuan Shang wanted on their side, refused to help either of them and was thrown into prison. Chen Lin and Yin Kui saved Cui Yan. In 204, during the Battle of Ye between Cao Cao and Yuan Shang, Cao Cao sent a messenger to meet Chen Lin and ask him to surrender, but Chen Lin refused and was taken prisoner after Ye city fell to Cao Cao.

Many people feared for Chen Lin as they thought that Cao Cao would execute him for writing the "Proclamation to Yu Province on Behalf of Yuan Shao". However, Cao Cao not only spared Chen Lin because he appreciated his literary talent, but also recruited him to serve as a Libationer and Military Adviser under the Minister of Works. Chen Lin served under Cao Cao since then and helped him write official documents. He died in a great plague which rampaged through China in 217.

Works 
His surviving writings include literary yuefu written in imitation of current folk ballads, and he is considered one of the major exponents of this typical Jian'an poetry style, along with Cao Cao and others. Cao Cao's son and successor, Cao Pi, ranked Chen Lin as what he termed the "Seven Scholars (子 zi) of Jian'an". The other six members of the "Seven Scholars of Jian'an" were Wang Can, Ruan Yu, Liu Zhen, Xu Gan,  and Kong Rong. In 218, the year following the plague, Cao Pi wrote a letter to a friend lamenting that Chen Lin and three other members of the "Seven Scholars of Jian'an" had died in the previous year.

One of Chen Lin's yuefu poems was translated by Wai-lim Yip as "Water the Horses at a Breach in the Great Wall".

See also
 Lists of people of the Three Kingdoms
 Jian'an poetry

Notes

References

Further reading 
 Chen, Shou (3rd century). Records of the Three Kingdoms (Sanguozhi).
 Pei, Songzhi (5th century). Annotations to Records of the Three Kingdoms (Sanguozhi zhu).
 
 

2nd-century births
Year of birth unknown
217 deaths
Seven scholars of Jian'an
Officials under Yuan Shao
Officials under Cao Cao
Politicians from Huai'an
Han dynasty politicians from Jiangsu